UE Extremenya is an Andorran football club based in the parish of La Massana. The club currently plays in Segona Divisió.

History
The club was founded in 1998 as CE Cerni. The club played the 1998–99 Campionat de Lliga, being relegated to the Segona Divisió at the end of the season. They stayed in the Second Division until the coming back in the top flight during the 2002–03 season. The club was relegated after finishing 8th at the end of the regular season.

The club suffered another relegation to the Second Division for the 2005–06 season after one year in the top division. The 2005–06 season in the Andorran Premier League was a catastrophe with only one point in 20 games (1–1 at home against CE Principat on 12 February 2006).

The following season they finished 5th in the Second Division of Andorra. The club has never stayed for two consecutive years in the Andorran Premier League, being participated in the top flight during three different seasons (1999–00, 2003–04 and 2006–07).

UE Extremenya played the playoffs for one spot in Primera Divisió after finishing third in the Second Division of Andorra during the 2009–10 season (promotion-ineligible Lusitanos B finished second). Facing FC Encamp after two games UE Extremenya lost in the aggregate of 2–5. Two years after during the 2011–12 season, UE Extremenya finished second in the Segona Divisió, competed in a two-legged playoff against Inter Club d'Escaldes for being in the Premier Andorran League the following season. The team lost in the aggregate of 0–3.

Colors and badge

The club colors representing the club are traditionally black, white and green as the Spanish autonomous community of Extremadura. The flag of Extremadura is featured in the kit.

Name history
1998: The club was founded as CE Cerni
2002: The club changed his name to FC Cerni
2003: The club changed his name to UE Extremenya

Primera Divisió history

External links
UE Extremenya at RSSSF
UE Extremenya at FAF.ad

Extremenya
1998 establishments in Andorra
Association football clubs established in 1998